Roy A. Harrisville II (born April 22, 1922) is an American Lutheran theologian who has written on the interpretation of the New Testament.

Harrisville was educated at Luther Theological Seminary, 1947 (in Saint Paul, Minnesota), Princeton Seminary, 1953, Princeton, New Jersey, and the University of Tübingen in Germany. He served as a pastor in Mason City, Iowa, before joining the faculty of Luther Theological Seminary as professor of New Testament (1958-1992). He is co-founder of Dialog, A Journal of Theology, and member of the Society of Biblical Literature and Studiorum Novi Testamenti Societas.

Harrisville's view on the nature of scripture and the interaction between human writers and the Holy Spirit helped shape the preaching and theology of Lutherans in North America for over 40 years. His works include The Bible in Modern Culture: Baruch Spinoza to Brevard Childs with Walter Sundberg and Fracture: The Cross as Irreconcilable in the Language and Thought of the Biblical Writers.
Dr. Harrisville believed the historical critical method could be harnessed in service of the Gospel.  His long friendship with Ernst Kasemann led to several translations and reviews of Kasemann's work.  Dr. Harrisville is listed in "Das Bultman Handbuch," (Mohr-Siebeck, 2017).   The Harrisville-Kasemann correspondence can be found in the University of Tübingen Library and in the Luther Seminary Archives.

Books
  The Scriptural Significance of the Concepts "Light" and "Darkness" in the Old Testament.  Luther Theological Seminary Thesis (unpublished, 1947).
  God Incognito:  A Series of Lenten Sermons on the Passion according to St. John (Minneapolis: Augsburg, 1956).
  The Concept of Newness in the New Testament (Minneapolis: Augsburg, 1960).
  Kerygma and History: A Symposium on the Theology of Rudolf Bultmann.  Selected, translated and edited by Carl E. Braaten and Roy A. Harrisville (Nashville: Abingdon, 1962).
  The Historical Jesus and the Kerygmatic Christ: Essays on the New Quest of the Historical Jesus.  Translated and edited by Carl E. Braaten and Roy A. Harrisville (Nashville: Abingdon, 1964).
  His Hidden Grace: The Origins, Task and Witness of Biblical Criticism (Nashville: Abingdon, 1965).
  The Miracle of Mark: A Study in the Gospel (Minneapolis: Augsburg, 1967).
  Pick Up Your Trumpet (Minneapolis: Augsburg, 1970).
  Play On Your Harp: Meditations on Biblical Themes (Minneapolis: Augsburg, 1975).
  Frank Chamberlain Porter: Pioneer in American Biblical Interpretation (Missoula: Scholars Press, 1976).
  Benjamin Wisner Bacon:  Pioneer in American Biblical Criticism (Missoula: Scholars Press, 1976).
  Romans: Augsburg Commentary on the New Testament (Minneapolis: Augsburg, 1980).
  Holy Week:  Proclamation 2, Series B:  Aids for Interpreting the Lessons of the Church Year, with Charles D. Hackett (Philadelphia: Fortress, 1981).
  Holy Week:  Proclamation 3, Series C (Philadelphia: Fortress, 1984.
  First Corinthians:  Augsburg Commentary on the New Testament (Minneapolis: Augsburg, 1987).
  Ministry in Crisis (Minneapolis: Augsburg, 1987).
  The Bible and Modern Culture, with Walter Sundberg (Eerdmans: 1995).
  The Bible and Modern Culture, trans.  Korean.    
  New Proclamation, Series A, 1999, Augsburg-Fortress.
  Second Edition, The Bible and Modern Culture, Eerdmans: 2002.
  Fracture, The Cross as Irreconcilable in the Language and Thought of the Biblical Writers, Eerdmans, 2006
 Pandora's Box Opened, Eerdmans, 2014.
 That Reminds Me: A Memoir. MN: Eclipse Press, 2020 (Kindle Publishing).
 The Story of Jesus: A Mozaic, Eugene, OR: Wipf & Stock, 2020.
 "Biblical Interpretation and the Interpretation of Natural Phenomena" in Talking God in Society, Festchrift for Peter Lampe, ed. Ute E. Eisen and Heidrun E. Mader, Vol I, 91-112, Gottingen: Vandenhoeck & Ruprecht, 2020.
 Tell It on the Mountain: A Collection of Sermons, St. Paul, MN: Eclipse Press, 2021 (Kindle Publishing).
 A Brief Guide to New Testament Interpretation: History, Methods, and Practical Examples. Eugene, OR: Wipf & Stock, 2022.

Translations:

  "Behold, I Make All Things New!" by Peter Stuhlmacher, Lutheran World.  15 (1968): 3-15.
  Mark The Evangelist: Studies on the Redaction History of the Gospel, by Willi Marxsen.  Translated with James Boyce, Donald Juel and William Poehlmann (Nashville: Abingdon, 1969).
  The Problem of Miracle in Primitive Christianity, by Anton Fridrichsen.  Translated with John S. Hanson (Minneapolis: Augsburg, 1972).
  "The Christology of Chalcedon in Ecumenical Discussion," by Edmund Schlink, Dialog. 2 (Spring, 1963).
  "A Protestant View of the Vatican Council Schema `De Ecclesia,'" by Edmund Schlink, Dialog. 3 (Spring 1964).
  Historical Criticism and Theological Interpretation of Scripture, by Peter Stuhlmacher (Philadelphia: Forgress, 1977).
  The Influence of the Holy Spirit:  The Popular View of the Apostolic Age and the Teaching of the Apostle Paul, by Hermann Gunkel. (Philadelphia: Fortress, 1979).
 "The Signs of an Apostle: Paul's Miracles;" "The Center of Scripture in Luke;" "The Circumcised Messiah;" "The Daughters of Abraham: Women in Acts," The Unknown Paul, by Jacob Jervell (Minneapolis: Augsburg, 1984).
  The Wandering People of God, by Ernst Käsemann.  Translated with Irving L. Sandberg (Minneapolis: Augsburg, 1984).
  The Second Letter to the Corinthians, by Rudolf Bultmann (Minneapolis: Augsburg, 1985).
  The Freedom of a Christian, by Eberhard Jüngel (Minneapolis: Augsburg, 1988).
  Rudolf Bultmann,  What Is Theology, Fortress 1998.
  Translation of Käsemann's 1937 sermon (1999 unpublished).
  Translation of Käsemann's Rückblick for Dialog, Vol. 38, Spring 1999.
  Bernard Lohse, Luther's Theology, Fortress.  2000.
  Translation of Udo Snelle essay
  Translation of Käsemann's On Being a Disciple of the Crucified Nazarene, Eerdmans.
  Translation with Mark Mattes of Johann Georg Hamann, Eerdmans.Feb. 2011
  Translation of Oswald Bayer essay (2011 unpublished).
  Translation of Käsemann's Kirchliche Konflikte, Baker Book House, 2021.

References

External links
Luther Seminary web page
Tubingen University Library

1922 births
Living people
American biblical scholars
New Testament scholars
Princeton Theological Seminary alumni
University of Tübingen alumni
20th-century Lutheran theologians
21st-century Lutheran theologians